Viktor Baykov (born February 9, 1935 in Ryazan, Russia) is a retired marathon runner from the Soviet Union, who won the bronze medal at the European Championships, behind Great Britain's Brian Kilby and Belgium's Aurèle Vandendriessche. He is a four-time winner of the Soviet national marathon title (1961-1964).

References
 ARRS.net
 ARRS.net
 Sports Reference

Russian male long-distance runners
Soviet male long-distance runners
Athletes (track and field) at the 1964 Summer Olympics
Olympic athletes of the Soviet Union
1935 births
Living people
European Athletics Championships medalists
Sportspeople from Ryazan